Penis sheath may refer to:

 Koteka, a piece of clothing in New Guinea
 Namba (clothing), in Vanuatu
 Penile sheath, a fold of skin that covers the penis in male mammals